Escorpiones Fútbol Club is a football club that plays in the Liga Premier de México – Serie A. It is based in Cuernavaca, Mexico.

History
The team was founded on May 7, 2021, with the aim of recovering professional football in Cuernavaca, a city that had been left without sports representation after the dissolution of Halcones de Morelos in 2018. In the presentation of the club, the team named Héctor Anguiano as their manager with the aim of creating a team in which local players had an important presence within the squad.

The team was officially entered into soccer competitions on July 30, 2021, when its entry into the Liga Premier – Serie A was announced, the club was placed in Group 2 of this category. After entering the league, the team met its first players: Sebastián Madrid, Francisco Córdova and Enzo Díez.

Stadium

The Estadio Centenario is a multi-purpose stadium in Cuernavaca, Mexico. Its primary current use is for football matches. The stadium has a capacity of 14,800 people and was opened in 1969 and renovated in 2009.

Players

Current squad

Reserve teams
Coyotes
Reserve team that plays in the Liga TDP, the fourth level of the Mexican league system.

References

Football clubs in Morelos
Association football clubs established in 2021
2021 establishments in Mexico
Liga Premier de México
Cuernavaca